Francisco da Costa Aragão (born 5 May 1995), commonly known as Chico, is a Brazilian footballer who currently plays as a forward for Colombian club Atlético Nacional.

Career statistics

Club

Notes

References

1995 births
Living people
Brazilian footballers
Brazilian expatriate footballers
Association football forwards
Club Athletico Paranaense players
Esporte Clube Internacional de Lages players
Tombense Futebol Clube players
Esporte Clube São José players
Operário Ferroviário Esporte Clube players
Venados F.C. players
Atlante F.C. footballers
Querétaro F.C. footballers
Club Bolívar players
Liga MX players
Ascenso MX players
Brazilian expatriate sportspeople in Mexico
Expatriate footballers in Mexico